Faridabad New Town railway station is on the Agra–Delhi chord.  It is located in Faridabad district in the Indian state of Haryana. It serves Faridabad and surrounding areas.

History
The Agra–Delhi chord was opened in 1904. Some parts of it were relaid during the construction of New Delhi (inaugurated in 1927–28).

Electrification
The Faridabad–Mathura–Agra section was electrified in 1982–85.

Suburban railway
Faridabad New Town is part of the Delhi Suburban Railway and is served by EMU trains.

Passengers
Faridabad New Town railway station handles around 129,000 passengers every day.

References

External links
 Trains at Faridabad New Town

Railway stations in Faridabad district
Delhi railway division
Transport in Faridabad